The Slănic de Răzvad (also: Slănicul de Sus or Slănic) is a left tributary of the river Ialomița in Romania. It flows into the Ialomița near Nisipurile.

References

Rivers of Romania
Rivers of Dâmbovița County